The Banque nationale pour le commerce et l'industrie (BNCI, "National Bank for Trade and Industry") was a major French bank, active from 1932 to 1966 when it merged with Comptoir national d'escompte de Paris to form Banque Nationale de Paris (BNP). It was itself the successor of the Comptoir d'Escompte de Mulhouse, a bank founded in 1848 under the Second French Republic, and its subsidiary formed in 1913, the Banque Nationale de Crédit.

Comptoir d'Escompte de Mulhouse

In May 1852, the government withdrew its financial support, and the Comptoir national d'escompte de Mulhouse was one of less than a dozen  that survived, together with those in Alès, Angoulême, Caen, Colmar, Dôle, Lille, Rouen, Sainte-Marie-aux-Mines, Sablé, and the Comptoir National d'Escompte de Paris.

Following the French defeat in the Franco-Prussian War in 1870, the CEM's head office in Mulhouse found itself in the German Empire, even though many of the bank's operations and shareholders were across the new border in France. From the late 1880s under general manager Eugène Raval, it engaged in ambitious further expansion in France by buying local banks and opening new branches. By the beginning of 1913, the CEM had 16 branches, 44 agencies and 34 part-time offices, the vast majority of which were in France, versus only three in Alsace-Lorraine and one in Zurich.

Banque Nationale de Crédit

Eugène Raval was its first managing director, then in 1914 became its chairman, taking over from Georges Cochery, and kept that position until 1923. The BNC soon undertook a series of acquisitions of its own including those of the Banque du Midi, Crédit du Centre, Crédit du Sud-Ouest, Banque de Nancy, and Banque de Metz. By 1922, it had expanded to 442 agencies. That same year, it acquired the Paris-based Banque Française pour le Commerce et l'Industrie (BFCI). In 1924, it became France's most profitable bank, with profits exceeding 30 million francs. It also opened a branch in London in 1928, and ranked fourth among French banks by total deposits, behind the long-established leaders Comptoir National d'Escompte de Paris, Crédit Lyonnais, and Société Générale. 

Meanwhile, the CEM engaged in dynamic expansion of its own, growing from 4 locations in 1913 to 57 in 1930. In 1921, CEM and its part-owned subsidiary the BNC reached an agreement not to compete on their respective turfs, respectively Alsace-Lorraine and the rest of France. CEM gradually sold its BNC shares, partly to the ) and to the BFCI before its merger with the BNC. Eventually, in May 1930, the BNC acquired its former parent the CEM.

Partly as a result of its rapid growth, the BNC ran into financial difficulties in the challenging environment of the early 1930s. Confidence in its soundness evaporated in the course of 1931. To avoid a disorderly crash, the French government and a consortium of banks and other companies attempted a rescue intervention. They forced the director (André Vincent, also director of the ) to resign, and the Bank of France took over BNC debts in September 1931. This, however, was not enough to put an end to the ongoing bank run, and the Minister of Finance, assisted by a group of French banks, went on to provide an additional guarantee for depositors. Even so, the worldwide crisis kept spreading and investors continued to withdraw their money. By late 1931, over 75% of BNC deposits had been withdrawn, causing the bank's share price to slump. In January 1932 the French authorities eventually decided to liquidate it.

Establishment of the Banque Nationale pour le Commerce et l'Industrie

The BNCI was created on the 18 April 1932 to take over the viable business activities of the defunct BNC, while the latter's remaining assets were being liquidated in a process that enabled the reimbursement of the French public assistance by 1950 and of other creditors in 1962; even former shareholders were eventually able to recover positive value. The former bank's headquarters and staff were used to create BNCI with fresh capital of 100 million French francs. The French government appointed François Albert-Buisson, former President of the Tribunal de commerce de la Seine, as its new president.

Further expansion and developments until 1966 merger

In 1934, BNCI opened a regional administration centre in Bordeaux, and later created seven other regional centers to handle routine branch teller tasks. Starting in 1937 it started expanding by buying a number of struggling local and regional banks.

Under German occupation, BNCI's domestic business stagnated as was the case with other major French banks, but its international development was more dynamic. This was soon renamed  (BNCIA) and became a basis for expansion over the following two decades in French North Africa, French West Africa, French Equatorial Africa, and the French West Indies. Later in 1940, Pose opened branches in Casablanca and in Saint-Louis, Senegal. It also developed a network in Syria and Lebanon during the war.

In 1945, under the impetus of Finance Minister René Pleven, the French government nationalized the Bank of France and the four major depository banks, including BNCI.

In 1947, the London branch of BNCI was transformed into a subsidiary and renamed the British & French Bank (BFB), with shares held by BNCI, S.G. Warburg and Robert Benson & Co. In 1974, the BFB would return to full ownership by its parent, by then the Banque Nationale de Paris, and was eventually renamed BNP plc in 1981.

The bank's overseas activities evolved in the international context of decolonization. In 1954, the BNCI transformed the  into . In 1961, it formed  by merging its Tunisian activity with a separate subsidiary it had created in 1955, Union financière et technique de Tunisie (UFITEC). The BFB's operations in Nigeria, which had started in 1949 with the opening of a branch in Lagos, were restructured into the United Bank for Africa (UBA) in 1961 following the country’s independence; the BFB initially held a 58% majority stake in UBA, but that decreased to 32.5% in 1973 and 25.5% in 1976 as the Nigerian government gradually took control. In the former French colonies of sub-Saharan Africa, the BNCI created national subsidiaries in 1962 under the brand name  (BICI, "International Bank for Trade and Industry"), e.g. in Côte d'Ivoire ( - BICICI), Gabon ( - BICIG), Senegal ( - BICIS), Cameroon, and the Republic of the Congo. In Algeria, its successor the BNP eventually had to terminate its activity in late 1967 and sold its branch properties to the Bank of Algeria in January 1968.

In the 1950s, BNCI strengthened its position in the domestic retail banking market in France, while at the same time creating specialist services that provided financial advice to French businesspeople and entrepreneurs to help them explore new resources or markets in the developing world. By 1965, BNCI was the only French bank with such an international network.

On 4 May 1966, Minister of Finance Michel Debré announced the merger of BNCI with Comptoir national d'escompte de Paris (CNEP) under the new name of Banque Nationale de Paris (BNP). BNCI provided BNP with a large international network and significantly contributed to its asset base.

Head office building in Paris

The BNC's initial head office in 1913 was at 20, rue Le Peletier. In 1917, it was relocated to 16, Boulevard des Italiens, which has remained the registered address of its successor entities all the way to BNP Paribas. The BNC subsequently acquired adjoining properties, including the famed . In the 1920s, in the urban renewal context of completion of the Boulevard Haussmann, it had them all demolished to erect an iconic new headquarters building, which ironically was completed in 1931 just as the bank was going through the financial turmoil that would soon lead to its replacement by the BNCI. 

That space was formerly occupied by a number of different buildings including the celebrated Café Riche, that were demolished for the new construction. The BNC building was initially designed in 1927 by architects Georges Guiard and Olivier Carré, but the facades were subsequently modified at the bank's request into a more pioneering art deco style by architects  and Charles Letrosne, while the building's structure was already near complete. Marrast and Letrosne's elevations include monumental engaged columns that are loosely reminiscent of Ancient Egyptian architecture. The atrium inside is covered by a concrete vault made translucent by the insertion of glass bricks.

The building immediately to the east at 2, boulevard des Italiens (and 1, boulevard Haussmann), on a wedge-shaped block marking the intersection of Boulevard des Italiens and Boulevard Haussmann, was built in 1925-1927 on a design by architects  and Marcel Julien, with a striking rotunda at the tip. On the corner with rue Le Peletier, it replaced an earlier building that had successively been the Parisian branch office of the Russo-Chinese Bank, of its successor the Russo-Asiatic Bank from 1910, and of the short-lived Banca Italiana di Sconto from World War I to its collapse in 1921. It was annexed by the expanding BNCI in 1957 and was lightly remodeled by Marrast on that occasion to form part of the enlarged headquarters complex, including metalwork on the ground floor to host a foreign exchange office. A bridge was added in 1968 to connect the two buildings at the first-floor level.

References

External sources
 An innovative Bank : the Banque nationale pour le commerce et l'industrie (BNCI) in Source d'Histoire

 

Defunct banks of France
BNP Paribas